The Essential Red Collection is a greatest hits album by Sammy Hagar. It includes some of his early works, from "Bad Motor Scooter" with Montrose, released demos, film soundtrack songs to more recent material. It was released in 2004 on Hip-O Records. It excludes songs from his time with Van Halen.

Song information
 "Thinking of You" was retooled for Hagar's first album, Nine on a Ten Scale, and included with the title, "Rock 'n' Roll Romeo".
 A different version of "Heavy Metal" was included on the Heavy Metal soundtrack. The version included here, however, was the re-recorded version for his Standing Hampton album.
 "Winner Takes It All", "Give to Live", and "Eagles Fly" feature Edward Van Halen on bass guitar.

Track listing
"Bad Motor Scooter" (Sammy Hagar) - 3:41 (originally from the Montrose album by Montrose)
"Thinking of You" (Sammy Hagar)  - 3:42 (previously unreleased 1974 demo)
"Call My Name" (Sammy Hagar) - 3:03 (previously unreleased 1974 demo)
"Red" (John Carter/Sammy Hagar) - 4:04 (originally from Hagar's second album, Sammy Hagar)
"I've Done Everything for You" (Sammy Hagar) - 3:03 (originally released as a B-side to the 1979 "(Sittin' On) The Dock of the Bay" single)
"Heavy Metal" (Sammy Hagar/Jim Peterik) - 3:49 (from the album Standing Hampton; original version appears on the soundtrack album Heavy Metal)
"I'll Fall in Love Again" (Sammy Hagar) - 4:10 (originally from Hagar's Standing Hampton album)
"There's Only One Way to Rock" (Sammy Hagar) - 4:14 (originally from Hagar's Standing Hampton album)
"Fast Times at Ridgemont High" (Sammy Hagar) - 3:34 (originally from the Fast Times at Ridgemont High soundtrack)
"Your Love Is Driving Me Crazy" (Sammy Hagar) - 3:30 (originally from Hagar's Three Lock Box album)
"Two Sides of Love" (Sammy Hagar) - 3:41 (from the album VOA)
"I Can't Drive 55" (Sammy Hagar) - 4:12 (originally from Hagar's VOA album)
"The Girl Gets Around" (Dean Pitchford/Sammy Hagar) - 3:21 (originally from the Footloose soundtrack)
""Winner Takes It All" (Giorgio Moroder/Thomas Whitlock) - 3:58 (originally from the Over the Top soundtrack)
"Give to Live" (Sammy Hagar) - 4:22 (originally from Hagar's I Never Said Goodbye album)
"Eagles Fly" (Sammy Hagar) - 4:59 (originally from Hagar's I Never Said Goodbye album)
"High Hopes" (Sammy Hagar) - 5:28 (originally from Hagar's Unboxed greatest hits package)
"Little White Lie" (Sammy Hagar) - 2:52 (originally from Hagar's Marching to Mars album)
"Marching to Mars" (Sammy Hagar) - 5:05 (originally from Hagar's Marching to Mars album)
"Mas Tequila" (Gary Glitter/Sammy Hagar/Mike Leander) - 4:10 (originally from Hagar's Red Voodoo album)

Singles
 "Call My Name" b/w "Eagles Fly (Unreleased Radio Edit)" b/w "Eagles Fly (Album version)" (Hip-O)

Versions
 Hip-O Records (US) : B0002760-02

References

External links
 Lyrics from Hagar's official site

Sammy Hagar albums
2004 greatest hits albums